John Medows Rodwell (1808–1900) was a friend of Charles Darwin while both matriculated at Cambridge. He became an English clergyman of the Church of England and an Islamic studies scholar.  He served as Rector of St.Peter's, Saffron Hill, London 1836-43 and Rector of St Ethelburga's, Bishopsgate, London from 1843–1900. He and Darwin maintained a correspondence after their graduation.

Qur'an translation
Rodwell's Qur'an translation The Koran was first published in 1861. In the 1994 Everyman Library edition the Surahs, which Rodwell originally ordered chronologically, have been put back in the traditional order, from long to short. Rodwell's outdated preface and professor G. Margoliouth's introductory notes have been replaced by a new introduction by Alan Jones, and some of Rodwell's obsolete notes have been removed as well. According to Jones, when comparing with the Qur'an translations of Sale (1734), Palmer (1880), Pickthall (1930), Bell (1937-9) and Arberry (1955), the strengths of Rodwell's translation lies in its "nineteenth century positivistic approach" and his much better cross-referencing to biblical texts, which is "crucial to one's understanding if the Qur'an".

References

External links 
 
 The Koran: Translated from the Arabic, the Suras Arranged In Chronological Order - First edition 1861, London, published by Williams and Norgate.

 Al-Quran project includes the Qur'an translation of John Medows Rodwell
 
 

1808 births
1900 deaths
Christian scholars of Islam
Translators of the Quran into English
19th-century translators